Quakers use the term Query to refer to a question or series of questions used for reflection and in spiritual exercises.

Friends have used Queries as tools for offering spiritual challenges to the community for much of their  history. Queries often take the form of a collection of themed questions that are read at the beginning of a time of worship or reflection.

Many yearly meetings maintain a set of basic queries in their books of  Faith and Practice to provide guidance on certain issues over time. Individuals often offer queries from time to time to provide a spiritual challenge to their local community of Friends.

External links
Examples of Queries:
Australia Yearly Meeting Questions for all Quakers (2008) (.pdf)
  Baltimore Yearly Meeting's queries.  Also included are proposed queries from the Faith and Practice revision committee
 Britain Yearly Meeting Advices and Queries and introductory material, including 1656 statement
Philadelphia Yearly Meeting's Faith and Practice, which contains a set of queries

Quaker practices